Alessandro Guidoni (July 15, 1880 – April 27, 1928) served as a general in the Regia Aeronautica (Italian Royal Air Force). Guidonia Montecelio, the small town and comune where he died while testing a new parachute, was named after him in 1937.

Life

Guidoni was born in Turin, Italy, on 15 July 1880. He obtained his degree in engineering at the Turin Polytechnic in 1903 and in 1905, while serving in the Navy Engineering Corps, took his second degree in naval engineering. In 1909 he developed a keen interest in the newborn Corpo Aeronautico Militare ("Military Aviation Corps") of the Regio Esercito (Italian Royal Army), joining many aviation pioneers.

Guidoni served in the Italo-Turkish War of 1911-1912 as a pilot trainee, soon achieving a full certification and flying "hydroplanes" (seaplanes). He then started studying weaponry and developed a new gyroscope-guided bomb to be delivered by planes against distant targets. In 1912, as a captain, he experimented with the air-launching of torpedoes by dropping weights from a Farman biplane. He also drew the plans of the seaplane carrier Europa, which entered service with the Regia Marina (Italian Royal Navy) in 1915.

In 1920, Guidoni joined the Italian Embassy in London as military attaché with the rank of colonel. When the Corpo Aeronautico Militare separated from the army in 1923 to become an independent service, the Regia Aeronautica, he became a member of the new service, and achieved the rank of general.

On the morning of 27 April 1928, being dissatisfied with its design, Guidoni tested personally a new model of parachute at the Regia Aeronautica airfield at Montecelio, Italy, and was fatally injured when it failed.

Commemoration and legacy

Guidoni posthumously received the Medaglia d’Oro al Valore aeronautico ("Gold Medal for Aeronautic Valor").

The third Dornier Do X flying boat built, the X3, registered as I-ABBN, was named Alessandro Guidoni in Guidonis honor, and entered service in May, 1932. A private airline, Società Anonima di Navigazione Aerea (SANA) flew it initially; the Regia Aeronautica later operated it.

In the 1930s a town was built around the airfield at Montecelio to house military personnel. Benito Mussolini, the Italian Duce, laid the towns founding stone on 27 April 1935, the seventh anniversary of Guidonis death. In 1937, Montecelio and the surrounding comune were renamed Guidonia Montecelio in Guidonis honor.

Only a military airfield exists at Guidonia Montecelio today, but a memorial to Guidonia stands on the exact spot where he died in front of the Sacred Heart of Jesus Church.

Guidoni's passion for flight was celebrated publicly by General Ermanno Aloia of the Aeronautica Militare Italiana (Italian Air Force) celebrated Guidonis passion for flight 26 April 2006 with these words: “A perfect fusion of  military engineer and  scientist, General Guidoni (ITAF) represents more than anyone else in our country the passion of man to conquer space, reach other planets, and investigate stars.”

Decorations 

Gold Medal for Aeronautic Valor

Notes

Bibliography 

 Alessandro Guidoni, Aviazione, idroaviazione : origine, storia, sviluppi, dagli albori alle traversate aeree dell'Atlantico : note, documenti, disegni, progetti, studi, esperienze ideate ed effettuate dall'eroico generale Alessandro Guidoni raccolte ordinate da Guido Mattioli, Roma, Pinciana, a. XIII dell'E.F. (1935/36)
 Intervento del gen. Isp. Capo Ermanno Aloia alla cerimonia di commemorazione del gen. Guidoni del 26 aprile 2006
 Portale Aeronautica Militale Italiana
 hazegray.org World Aircraft Carriers List: Italy
 Chant, Chris. The Worlds Great Bombers. New York: Barnes & Noble Books, 2000. .

Italian aviators
Italian Air Force generals
Italian military personnel of the Italo-Turkish War
Italian military personnel of World War I
Military personnel from Turin
Parachuting deaths
1880 births
1928 deaths
Accidental deaths in Italy
Italian air attachés
Recipients of the Medal of Aeronautic Valor